The Burnham-on-Sea Championships was a men's and women's grass court (then later hard court) tennis tournament founded as the Burnham-on-Sea Open in 1927 at the Avenue Tennis Club, Burnham-on-Sea, Somerset, England. The tournament ran annually until 1980.

History
In 1922 a Burnham-on-Sea tournament was established at the Avenue Tennis Club, Burnham-on-Sea, Somerset, England that was a closed tournament only. In 1927 that tournament became an open event called the Burnham-on-Sea Open. When this tournament when staged it was usually held in conjunction with the Somerset Championships. The tournament was branded as the Burnham-on-Sea Open until the mid-1970s when it was renamend the Burnham-on-Sea Championships. The tournament was staged until 1980 when it was dicontinued.

Location and Venues
The tournament was at the Avenue Tennis Club, Burnham-on-Sea, Somerset, England. The club was founded in 1909 then consisting of 7 grass courts and 3 shale courts.

References

Defunct tennis tournaments in the United Kingdom
Grass court tennis tournaments
Hard court tennis tournaments
Tennis tournaments in England